Nellivananathar Temple, also known as Thirunellikaa, is a Hindu temple in the Tiruvarur district of Tamil Nadu, India. The presiding deity is Shiva.

References 
 

Shiva temples in Tiruvarur district